Syspira is a genus of spiders in the family Miturgidae. It was first described in 1895 by Simon. , it contains 15 species found in the U.S.A, Mexico, and Caribbean.

Species

As of 2017 Syspira comprises the following species:
Syspira analytica Chamberlin, 1924
Syspira eclectica Chamberlin, 1924
Syspira longipes Simon, 1895
Syspira pallida Banks, 1904
Syspira synthetica Chamberlin, 1924
Syspira tigrina Simon, 1895

References

Miturgidae
Araneomorphae genera
Spiders of North America